Lycaenesthini is a tribe of lycaenid butterflies in the subfamily Polyommatinae.

Genera
Anthene Doubleday, 1847 − ciliate blues or hairtails
Cupidesthes Aurivillius, 1895

References
 Polyommatinae at Markku Savela's website on Lepidoptera

 
Butterfly tribes
Taxa named by Lambertus Johannes Toxopeus